Daniela Potapova (born 17 January 1996) is a German rhythmic gymnast. She competed in the group rhythmic gymnastics competition at the 2016 Summer Olympics, where the team was eliminated in the qualification round.

References

External links 
 
 
 

Living people
1996 births
German rhythmic gymnasts
Gymnasts at the 2016 Summer Olympics
Olympic gymnasts of Germany
European Games competitors for Germany
Gymnasts at the 2015 European Games
20th-century German women
21st-century German women